Třemešná is a municipality and village in Bruntál District in the Moravian-Silesian Region of the Czech Republic. It has about 900 inhabitants.

Administrative parts
Villages of Damašek and Rudíkovy are administrative parts of Třemešná.

Geography
Třemešná is situated in the Osoblažsko microregion in the Zlatohorská Highlands. The built-up area lies in the valley of the Mušlov stream.

History
The first written mention of Třemešná is from 1256. It was one of the settlements that were founded in the area around 1251 at the initiative of the bishop Bruno von Schauenburg.

Transport

Třemešná lies on the Krnov–Głuchołazy–Jeseník railway line, and also is the starting point of the narrow-gauge Třemešná ve Slezsku – Osoblaha Railway.

Sights
The landmark of the municipality is the parish Church of Saint Sebastian. It was built in 1730–1733 and the church tower was added in 1780.

The narrow-gauge railway serves not only for transport but also as a tourist attraction. Steam trains run on weekends during the tourist season.

References

External links

Villages in Bruntál District